Hobbseus petilus, the Tombigbee riverlet crayfish, is a species of crayfish in the family Cambaridae. It is endemic to Mississippi in the United States.

References

Further reading

 
 

Cambaridae
Articles created by Qbugbot
Crustaceans described in 1977
Taxa named by Joseph F. Fitzpatrick Jr.
Endemic fauna of Mississippi